The 38th Parliament of British Columbia sat from 2005 to 2009, replacing the 37th parliament and being succeeded by the 39th parliament. It was composed of two elements, The Queen represented by the Lieutenant-Governor of British Columbia, Steven Point, and the Legislative Assembly of British Columbia as elected by the general election of British Columbia, Canada, on May 17, 2005.  The Speaker of the House was Bill Barisoff.

The 38th Parliament

†Speaker.

Three seats in the legislature were vacant when the assembly was dissolved: Comox Valley following the death in office of Stan Hagen, Peace River North following the appointment of Richard Neufeld to the Senate of Canada, and Vancouver-Langara following the resignation of Carole Taylor. As all three vacancies occurred less than six months before the next provincial election, by-elections were not held to fill the vacancies before the regular election.

Party standings of the 38th Parliament

Source: Legislative Assembly of BC

Seating plan
Reference:

References

Political history of British Columbia
Terms of British Columbia Parliaments
2005 establishments in British Columbia
2009 disestablishments in British Columbia